Paul Charles Ney Jr. (born June 6, 1958) is an American lawyer who served as the General Counsel of the Department of Defense of the United States from 2018 to 2021. He previously served as Acting General Counsel of the Navy and as the Chief Deputy Attorney General of Tennessee.

Early life

Paul C. Ney Jr. attended Cornell University, receiving a Bachelor of Science in Biology in 1980.  Ney next enrolled in the joint Juris Doctor and Master of Business Administration program at Vanderbilt University, graduating in 1984. He then spent 1984–85 clerking for Judge Adrian G. Duplantier of the United States District Court for the Eastern District of Louisiana.

Career
In 1985, Ney joined the law firm of Trauger, Ney & Tuke in Nashville, Tennessee.  He became a partner of the firm in 1990.  His practice at Trauger, Ney & Tuke focused on civil litigation, administrative law, arbitration and mediation, and intellectual property. He also served as the General Counsel of the Tennessee Republican Party and as an adjunct professor at Vanderbilt University Law School.

In 2006, President George W. Bush named Ney Principal Deputy General Counsel of the United States Department of the Navy. He served as Acting General Counsel of the Navy from January 2, 2006 until September 25, 2006. Upon leaving the Department of the Navy, Ney joined Nashville Mayor Karl Dean's Office of Economic and Community Development.

In February 2010, Ney joined the law firm of Patterson Intellectual Property Law.

On August 25, 2016, Tennessee Attorney General Herbert Slatery announced that Ney would join the Attorney General's Office as Chief Deputy. In his role as Chief Deputy Attorney General, Ney coordinates and supervises the substantive legal work of all five sections of the office.

In January 2018, President Donald Trump announced Ney as his nominee for General Counsel of the Department of Defense. He was confirmed by the Senate on July 12, 2018.

References

External links
Department of Defense biography

|-

|-

1958 births
Living people
Cornell University alumni
General Counsels of the United States Navy
George W. Bush administration personnel
Tennessee lawyers
Tennessee Republicans
Trump administration personnel
United States Department of Defense officials
Vanderbilt University alumni